KXIM (98.3 FM) is a radio station licensed to serve the community of Sanborn, Iowa. The station is owned by AM-770 Radio Engineering, and airs a variety format.

The station was assigned the KXIM call letters by the Federal Communications Commission on August 14, 2012.

References

External links
 Official Website
 

XIM
Radio stations established in 2015
2015 establishments in Iowa
Variety radio stations in the United States
O'Brien County, Iowa